Tot Voordeel en Genoegen (Profit and Pleasure) is a windmill built in 1798 on the Molendijk 15 in Alphen, Netherlands. 
It is a large post mill, built above a roundhouse, used for grinding wheat flour. 
It is the only windmill in the Netherlands that drives three pairs of millstones.
The mechanism is mostly wooden, since iron was expensive when it was built. 
The windmill, which is still functional, can be rotated on its post to face the wind for maximum effect.

History

"Tot Voordeel en Genoegen" (to advantage and satisfaction) was built in 1798 for P. van Dam. It is beside the river so it catches as much wind as possible.
The last miller to own and operate it was van Dreumel, to whom farmers in the Alphen area regularly brought their flour to be ground until 1978.  The municipality of West Maas en Waal now owns the mill, which is still functional, and may be visited for tours and demonstrations.
The post is no longer elm, but is now made from bilinga wood.  
The sides of the box are now also made from this wood.

Description

The upper part, which weighs , can be turned on this axis to orient the blades so they get maximum force from the wind.
The lower part of the windmill is a brick roundhouse. The ropes are made from flax, which was once grown in the area, and the gears are wooden.
Use of iron was avoided wherever possible due to the cost.

The mill is unique in having three sets of millstones, each of which can be operated independently.
The main drive from the upper wheel turns the forward wheel, which in turn drives the two rear wheels.  This differs from most post mills, where there are two sets of millstones, each driven directly by the upper wheel.

Owners
Owners have been:

 1798–1825: P. Dam
 1825–1850: A. Peters
 1850–1860: J. van Brink
 1860–1978: van Dreumel family
 1978–present: City of West Maas en Waal (currently managed by miller Jeg Li)

Gallery

References

Citations

General sources

External links 

 

Flour mills in the Netherlands
Post mills in the Netherlands
West Maas en Waal
Windmills completed in 1798
Windmills in Gelderland